Sir Richard Peto  (born 14 May 1943) is an English statistician and epidemiologist who is Professor of Medical Statistics and Epidemiology at the University of Oxford, England.

Education
He attended Taunton's School in Southampton and subsequently studied the Natural Sciences Tripos at Trinity College, Cambridge followed by a Master of Science degree in Statistics at Imperial College London.

Career and research
His career has included collaborations with Richard Doll beginning at the Medical Research Council Statistical Research Unit in London. He set up the Clinical Trial Service Unit (CTSU) in Oxford in 1975 and is currently co-director. Peto's paradox is named after him.

Awards and honours
He was elected a Fellow of the Royal Society in 1989 for his contributions to the development of meta-analysis. He is a leading expert on deaths related to tobacco use. "When Sir Richard Peto began work with the late Richard Doll fifty years ago, the UK had the worst death rates from smoking in the world. Smoking was the cause of more than half of all premature deaths of British men." He was knighted for his services to epidemiology and to cancer prevention in 1999, and he received an honorary Doctor of Medical Sciences degree from Yale University in 2011.

Personal life
His brother Julian Peto, with whom he has published work in mathematical statistics (e.g. on the logrank test), is also a distinguished epidemiologist. His family runs a Thai restaurant in the Covered Market, Oxford, of whose parent company he is a director.

References

Selected publications

 
 
 
 
 
 
 
 Peto R, Schneiderman M, eds. Quantification of occupational cancer. Cold Spring Harbor, NY: Cold Spring Harbor Laboratory, 1981. .
 
 Peto R, zur Hausen H, eds. Viral etiology of cervical cancer. Cold Spring Harbor, NY: Cold Spring Harbor Laboratory, 1986. .
 
 
 Peto R, Imperial Cancer Research Fund (Great Britain), World Health Organization, et al. Mortality from smoking in developed countries, 1950–2000: indirect estimates from national vital statistics. Oxford and New York: Oxford University Press, 1994. .
 
 
 
 
 
 
 
 
 

1943 births
Living people
Alumni of Queens' College, Cambridge
British epidemiologists
English statisticians
Fellows of Green Templeton College, Oxford
Members of the French Academy of Sciences
Donald Reid Medalists
Royal Medal winners
Winners of the Heineken Prize
Fellows of the Royal Society
Knights Bachelor
Fellows of the AACR Academy
Tobacco researchers
Members of the National Academy of Medicine